Jur Sital or Maithil New Year is the celebration of the first day of the Maithil new year also called Aakhar Bochhor. Maithils eat bari with bhaat (steamed rice) on the day. This day which usually falls on 15 April on Gregorian calendar is celebrated by the Maithils in Mithila region of India and Nepal. This is also called Nirayana Mesh Sankranti and Tirhuta new year. The festive occasion is in keeping with the Tirhuta Panchang calendar used in the Mithila region.

Origin and significance
The Maithili New Year follows the Nirayanam vernal equinox and falls on 14 April (may sometimes vary by a day) on the Gregorian year. 15 April marks the first day of the traditional Tirhuta Panchang. Tropical vernal equinox fall around 22 March, and adding 23 degrees of trepidation or oscillation to it, we get the Hindu sidereal or Nirayana Mesha Sankranti (Sun's transition into Nirayana Aries).

Hence, the Maithili calendar begins on the same date, with Baishakh as first month of the year. It is also observed by most traditional calendars in India as in Tamil Nadu, Assam, Bengal, Kerala, Manipur, Orissa, Punjab, Tripura and also in Nepal.

Official significance
Maithili Calendar is the traditional Calendar of Mithila region of India and Nepal. 
After a long period of demand, Bihar government in 2011 declared this day as public holiday to be observed statewide. Officially, the Maithili New year day is called as Mithila Diwas by the Government of Bihar. Every year there will be holiday for Mithila Diwas on 14 April in the Indian State of Bihar on account of the great festival of Juir Sheetal.

Gallery

See also 
 Mithila (region)
 Mithila (India)
 Mithila (Nepal)
 Tirhut
 Tirhuta script
 Maithili language
 Begusarai
 Madhubani
 Saharsa
 Supaul
 Muzaffarpur
 Vidyapati
 Darbhanga

References

External links

Mithila
Public holidays in India
Public holidays in Nepal
Nepalese culture
New Year in India
New Year celebrations
April observances
Observances set by the Vikram Samvat calendar
Culture of Mithila